Chapter 3: The Flesh is the fourth studio album by American singer Syleena Johnson. It was released by Jive Records on September 13, 2005 in the United States. The album spawned the singles "Hypnotic", which reached number eighty-one on the Hot R&B/Hip-Hop Songs, and "Another Relationship".

Critical reception

Allmusic found that Chapter 3: The Flesh "shows off more of Johnson's emotive, raspy-voiced style. From the provocative cover image to the album's song titles ("Special Occasion", "Phone Sex"), the subject matter of The Flesh is clear, yet it is Johnson's deeply bluesy, gospel-inflected delivery and the passionate conviction of her performances that make a lasting impression. Like Johnson's previous efforts, Chapter 3 bridges old-school soul of the '60s and '70s with an urban contemporary, hip-hop-inflected sound, and the results satisfy on both counts." Less impressed, David Peschek from The Guardian the album was moving Johnson "gradually further away from crafting her own classic. Her debut was an intermittently great wallow in the pain of a break-up; her voice a strikingly individual, deep and garnet-hued thing. But that individuality has drained away, leaving the bedroom soul of this third record cooing and woo-wooing with generic blankness."

Track listing

Notes
 signifies a co-producer

Charts

References

External links
 Official website
 

2005 albums
Albums produced by Jermaine Dupri
Albums produced by Kanye West
Albums produced by KayGee
Albums produced by R. Kelly
Jive Records albums
Syleena Johnson albums